Oncidium fuscatum is a species of orchid occurring from Colombia to Peru.

fuscatum